The Australian Adult Industry Awards (AAIA®) is an annual award that has been given out for outstanding achievements in the Australian adult industry since 2001.

The Australian Adult Industry Awards (AAIA®) commenced in 2001 and is designed to showcase outstanding achievements in the Australian adult industry, including awards for strippers, adult retail shops, film and video production, men’s bars, brothels, escort agencies, and everything associated with the adult industry, Australia wide.

The aim of the AAIA® is to establish legitimacy and mainstream acceptance or the industry and its participants. Winners of the awards can proudly display their winning logo as ‘a badge of honor’, which has fast become a sought-after prize.

The AAIA® has been founded, owned, and operated by industry legend, sex expert, and serial entrepreneur Maxine Fensom since its conception.

Maxine is well known in the adult industry for founding a number of strip clubs, strippers’ agencies, themed events, and adult online stores. 
In addition to being the founder of the Australian Adult Industry Awards, Fensom is also the founder and owner of the national Miss Erotica and Miss Dream Girl pageants. 

In 2004, the organizers of the awards were persuaded to be a partner of the Australian Taxation Office (ATO) to get 16,000 sex workers of Australia to declare their income. As part of the effort, the ATO decided to sponsor the event.

John Lark won the lifetime achievement award in 2006 for his contribution to the industry as a producer of 20 films featuring Australian "stars", including Alice Springs and Kelly Blue, in late 1980s.

References

External links

Past winners of the Adult Industry Awards
Winner of Best Newspaper and Website

2001 establishments in Australia
Awards established in 2001
Australian awards
Australian pornography
Pornographic film awards